Rydzówka may refer to the following places:
Rydzówka, Braniewo County in Warmian-Masurian Voivodeship (north Poland)
Rydzówka, Elbląg County in Warmian-Masurian Voivodeship (north Poland)
Rydzówka, Węgorzewo County in Warmian-Masurian Voivodeship (north Poland)